Raşit Tolun (29 February 1920 – 23 April 2000) was a Turkish alpine skier. He competed in two events at the 1948 Winter Olympics.

References

External links
 

1920 births
2000 deaths
Turkish male alpine skiers
Olympic alpine skiers of Turkey
Alpine skiers at the 1948 Winter Olympics
Sportspeople from Istanbul
20th-century Turkish people